Eko India Financial Services Pvt. Ltd. is an Indian fintech company, servicing the State Bank of India (SBI), ICICI Bank, and Yes Bank, and provides banking services and mobile banking. With Bharti AXA Life Insurance Company, it provides Bharti AXA Life - Bachat Bima, micro-insurance policies.

It was established by 2 brothers Abhishek and Abhinav Sinha and two others in 2007. It allows low-wage immigrants workers in the Indian urban areas to remit money to their homes using mobile phones.

History

Based on the recommendations of the Khan Commission, the Reserve Bank of India, in its 2005-2006 policy year introduced the concept of 'Business Correspondents' to enhance financial inclusion in the Indian banking sector. At the time co-founder Abhishek Sinha, a graduate of BIT Mesra, was working with Mahindra Satyam, and was involved in developing a mobile commerce application for a foreign company. 

Eventually inspired by a similar program in Brazil, M-Pesa model in Kenya where Vodafone-enabled subscribers send cash to other phone users by SMS, Globe Telecom and Smart Communications, both in the Philippines, Abhishek Sinha with brother Abhinav Sinha launched Eko in September 2007 with $0.5 million donated by family and friends as a financial service company providing peer-to-peer money transfers, cash deposits and withdrawal, wage and salary payments, micro-insurance, and micro-credit facilities to individuals through small neighbourhood shops, which became their banking agents. Eko planned to tie up with Centurion Bank of Punjab in 2008, to open accounts, which fell through after the latter merged with HDFC Bank, and the company hit a rough patch.

Bill Gates visited the Uttam Nagar, New Delhi situated mobile banking project of Eko, in November 2008, and an important turning point for the company came in March 2009 when it received a "grant funding" of $1.78 million from CGAP Technology Program which is housed within the World Bank and co-funded by Bill & Melinda Gates Foundation.

In February 2009, State Bank of India (SBI), the largest state-owned banking and financial services company in India, appointed Eko Aspire Foundation as its official business correspondent, which works actively in the field, while its Eko India Financial Services provides technological and non-technological support to the former. Thus around October 2009, with another grant from CGAP Eko started operations with the launch of 'SBI Mini Savings Bank Account' at Uttam Nagar, New Delhi on 23 February 2009, this allowed account holders to carry out financial transactions like deposit and withdrawal from their accounts through their mobile phones at various SBI Eko Customer Service Points, like local grocery stores, stationery stores, petrol pumps, PCOs and pharmaceutical shops in far flung villages of Bihar and Jharkhand and Delhi, where the low-wage people rarely have access to a banking system. By November 2010, it had 180,000 users carrying out over 7,000 transactions per day through its 500 "branches" in Delhi and 200 more in Bihar and Jharkhand, the hometowns of many maids and migrants. Eko gets a tiny commission from the bank for each transaction; further on the retailer who operates as Eko's banking agent also gets a commission on every account he holds and gets a cut on each transaction, and by August–September 2011, it started turning profit.

Meanwhile, it also tied up with ICICI Bank, India's second largest bank which started a Apna Savings Account scheme, and started gathering international business media attention, journalist Thomas Friedman wrote about it in The New York Times (Nov 2010)., while Business Week profiled it (Jan 2011).

In August 2010, Eko India was chosen amongst the 'NASSCOM EMERGE 50 – The League of Ten for 2010' list by NASSCOM, the Indian chamber of commerce, for "50 Emerging companies which are redefining the benchmark of excellence for the next generation of SMEs." In October 2011, Eko was selected as a Tech Awards laureate and won the cash prize for Economic Development.  Creation Investments Social Ventures Fund I, a leading private equity impact investment fund, and other co-investors are investors in Eko as they support financial inclusion for the bottom of the economic pyramid.

In April 2012, Eko was appointed by Yes Bank as a Business Correspondent to provide domestic money transfer services. The services went live in June 2012.

By January 2016, Eko had grown to manage ₹200 crore (₹20 million, or $30 million) among 1.1 million clients.

Today it services 180,000 users through a network of 700 branches (banking agents) through "Customer Service Points" (CSP), located in neighborhood grocery and pharmacy stores. It has locations in Delhi NCR, six districts of Bihar and one district of Jharkhand state.

See also
 Financial inclusion in India
 Branchless banking

References

External links
 Eko India Financial Services, website
 Leaders of Tomorrow: Eko India Financial Services at The Economic Times

Financial services companies based in Delhi
Indian companies established in 2007
State Bank of India
ICICI Bank
Financial services companies established in 2007
2007 establishments in Delhi